Vanessa Renee Williams, (born November 28, 1960 in Baton Rouge, Louisiana) is an American gospel music singer.

After working as a public school art teacher for many years, she signed with Light Records and Bajada Records.  Her debut album Vanessa was released in 2002 and made the top ten of Billboard magazine's gospel albums chart.  Her follow-up album Here I Go Again was released in 2004.  She performed for several years with Yolanda Adams and as a member of Richard Smallwood's ensemble Vision.

References

External links
 Artist Direct bio
 Gospel City bio
 Interview at VocalMusician.com

1960 births
Living people
American gospel singers
21st-century African-American women singers